Jussi Tirkkonen (24 June 1883, Kaavi – 14 April 1934) was a Finnish tailor and politician. He was a Member of the Parliament of Finland from 1916 to 1918, representing the Social Democratic Party of Finland (SDP).

References

1883 births
1934 deaths
People from Kaavi
People from Kuopio Province (Grand Duchy of Finland)
Social Democratic Party of Finland politicians
Members of the Parliament of Finland (1916–17)
Members of the Parliament of Finland (1917–19)